Jonathan Chu (born 21 March 1983) is an American former professional tennis player.

Chu was born and raised in New York. His grandfather, Joseph Chu, was a Hong Kong-Chinese immigrant to the United States and became one of the biggest landlords in New York's Chinatown.

Before turning professional in 2005, Chu played collegiate tennis for Harvard University while studying for an economics degree. He served as team captain and in his senior year reached the semi-finals of the NCAA Championships.

From 2005 to 2006 he competed internationally on the ITF circuit and in the occasional ATP Challenger tournament, reaching a career best singles ranking of 527 in the world.

In 2011 he returned to tennis to play Davis Cup for Hong Kong, where he worked as an investment banker. He won three singles and one doubles rubber in his Davis Cup career.

Chu is the manager director of his family's New York property business Chu Enterprises.

ITF Futures titles

Singles: (1)

Doubles: (4)

References

External links
 
 
 

1983 births
Living people
American male tennis players
Hong Kong male tennis players
Harvard Crimson men's tennis players
Tennis people from New York (state)
Sportspeople from New York City
American sportspeople of Hong Kong descent